Adetus punctatus is a species of beetle in the family Cerambycidae. It was described by Thomson in 1868.

References

Adetus
Beetles described in 1868